Bügsiin River is a river in the Khövsgöl aimag in Mongolia. It starts in the Bürentogtokh sum near the eastern end of Sangiin Dalai Lake, passes by the Tömörbulag sum center Jargalant and ends in the Tömörbulag sum at the Delger mörön River, very close to its confluence with the Ider River into the Selenge.

References

See also
List of rivers of Mongolia

Rivers of Mongolia